The 13th Annual Panasonic Gobel Awards (or the 13th Annual Panasonic Awards) honoring the favorite in television programming/production works/individual, was held on March 26, 2010, at the Ballroom Theater Djakarta XXI in Jalan M.H. Thamrin, Menteng, Central Jakarta. RCTI, Global TV and RCTI televised the ceremony in the Indonesia. This 2010 ceremony awards this issue titled "Indonesia Unite". The event coincides with the Golden Year of PT Panasonic Gobel Indonesia, as the organizer of Panasonic Awards.

With the momentum of the Golden Year of the PT Panasonic Gobel Indonesia provide additional award from Panasonic Awards names that have been used since 1997, the Panasonic Awards and was followed by changes to the logo of the award. The goal is to provide a clear identity that the show is an original idea from Indonesia. This idea was inspired by the spirit of Drs. H. Thayeb Mohammad Gobel, founder of Panasonic Gobel Indonesia and the presence of TV industry pioneer in Indonesia.

The 2010 ceremonies awards was hosted by four Indonesian best presenter. They are Tina Talisa (News tvOne), Raffi Ahmad (Dahsyat RCTI), Cathy Sharon (Inbox SCTV), and Choky Sitohang (Take Me Out Indonesia Indosiar).

Judges (Verification Team) 

Verification team of the 13th annual ceremonies consists of individual who expert on television and entertainment. They are:
 Rosiana Silalahi (Delegation of desk News)
 Manoj Punjabi (expertise of Soap-opera program dan Production House)
 Helmy Yahya (Delegation of Television industry performer)
 Indra Yudhistira (RCTI)
 Eko Patrio (artist)
 Robby Winarka (Industry performer)
 Maman Suherman (Industry performer)
 Sofyan Herbowo (public delegation)
 Karni Ilyas (TVOne)
 Quilla Jozal (Trans Corp), and
 Deddy Mizwar (artist delegation).

Performers

Presenters 
 Ridho Rhoma and Thalita Latief – Presented Favorite Music/Variety Show Program
 Ade Namnung and Amel Carla – Presented Favorite Children Program
 Richard Kevin and Carissa Putri – Presented Favorite Talkshow Presenter
 Arie Untung, Adul and Yuanita Christiani – Presented Favorite Talent Search Program
 Andre Taulany, Parto Patrio, Aziz Gagap and Sule – Presented Favorite Comedian
 Limbad and Deddy Corbuzier – Presented Favorite Sport Program
 Rinaldi Sjarif – Presented Lifetime Achievement Award
 Shireen Sungkar, Nikita Willy, Laudya Cynthia Bella, Naysilla Mirdad and Dinda Kanya Dewi – Presented Favorite Actor
 Chicco Jerikho, Olga Syahputra, Dude Herlino, Rionaldo Stockhorst and Teuku Wisnu – Presented Favorite Actress
 Mathias Muchus and Anwar Fuady – Presented Favorite Drama Series

Winners and nominees 
The nominees were announced on February 18, 2010. Winners are listed first and highlighted on boldface.

Program

Individual

See also 
 Panasonic Awards
 2011 Panasonic Gobel Awards

References

External links 
 Panasonic Awards Official Site

Panasonic Gobel Awards
2010 television awards